Club Deportivo Aguiluchos USA is an American soccer club, founded in 2012 and based in Oakland, California, that competes in the West Region, Golden Gate Conference of the National Premier Soccer League, the fourth division of the American soccer pyramid.

The club plays its home games at Raimondi Park. Its colors are orange and black, drawing inspiration from Águila of El Salvador, with a secondary kit of all blue, taking after the El Salvador flag and national team.

History 
CD Aguiluchos USA was founded in 2012 as a tribute to Águila of El Salvador and as a community club for many players of Salvadoran descent in Northern California. In December 2012, the team announced that it would be joining the National Premier Soccer League (NPSL), considered the fourth tier of the American soccer pyramid and roughly equal to the USL Premier Development League (PDL). The club would be coached by Argentine and notable former Águila player and manager, Hugo Coria, who led the Salvadoran club to three major titles.

The team played its first match on March 30, 2013; a 2–0 loss to Real San Jose. The team won its first competitive game on April 13, 4–0 at home over San Francisco Stompers FC, with a hat-trick by Jorge Ruiz and a lone goal by William Colocho.

In March 2014, Aguiluchos USA defeated Spartans Futbol Club 2–1, thanks to goals by Jorge Ruiz and former El Salvador international Rudis Corrales, which helped them qualify to the US Open Cup for the first time in the club history.

Colors and crest 
Aguiluchos USA home uniform mirrors that of the club it is named after, Águila of El Salvador, with an orange shirt, black shorts, and orange socks. Aguiluchos USA has worn a variation of this kit since its inception, with slight variations in trim, stripe width, number of stripes, and other minor details. The club usually complements this with a white and orange away uniform, with an additional away kit that mirrors the El Salvador national football team, with a blue shirt with white stripes, blue shorts, and blue socks.

The club badge features an eagle with two flags representing El Salvador and United States of America.

Year-by-year

Honors
Western Regional Champs (Playoff NPSL):
 Winners (2):  2015, 2017
Golden Gate Conference (NPSL):
 Winners (1): 2017

Current squad

In

Out

Personnel

Coaching staff

Management

Stadium 
Raimondi Park Stadium; Oakland, California (2013–2016,2018)
Burrell Field; San Leandro, California (2017)

Head coaches 
 Hugo Coria (2013-2016)
 Francisco Juarez (Aug 2017-)

See also 
 C.D. Águila, the parent club of C.D. Aguiluchos USA
 Chivas USA

References

External links

National Premier Soccer League teams
Ag
2012 establishments in California
Association football clubs established in 2012